The Gasparilla Bowl is an annual NCAA-sanctioned post-season college football bowl game played in the Tampa Bay area. It was first played in 2008 as the St. Petersburg Bowl at Tropicana Field in St. Petersburg, Florida. The game was renamed the Gasparilla Bowl in 2017 as a nod to the legend of José Gaspar, a mythical pirate who supposedly operated in the Tampa Bay area and who is the inspiration for Tampa's Gasparilla Pirate Festival. In May 2018, the owners announced the bowl would be relocated to Raymond James Stadium in Tampa.

Since 2020, it has been sponsored by Union Home Mortgage and officially known as the Union Home Mortgage Gasparilla Bowl. From 2010 to 2013 when Beef O'Brady's was the title sponsor, the game was officially known as simply the Beef O'Brady's Bowl. Previous sponsors include magicJack (2008), Beef O'Brady's (2009–2013), BitPay (2014), and Bad Boy Mowers (2017–2019).

History
The Gasparilla Bowl is the third college bowl game to be played in the Tampa Bay area; the Outback Bowl has been held in Tampa since 1986 and the Cigar Bowl was played from 1947 to 1954.

On April 30, 2008, the NCAA's Postseason Football Licensing Subcommittee approved a yet-to-be-named bowl game for Tropicana Field to be played as part of the 2008 college football season. On November 25, 2008, ESPN Regional Television, the game's owner, announced a one-year title sponsorship agreement with magicJack.

The inaugural magicJack St. Petersburg Bowl was played on December 20, 2008, between South Florida and Memphis. The hometown Bulls won by the score of 41–14, with quarterback Matt Grothe was named Most Outstanding Player.

For the 2009 game, restaurant chain Beef O'Brady's took over as presenting sponsor. The game became known as St. Petersburg Bowl Presented by Beef O'Brady's in December 2009 after the restaurant chain obtained a title sponsorship. Rutgers defeated UCF 45–24.

In 2010, the bowl's name was shortened to the Beef 'O' Brady's Bowl. Southern Miss faced Louisville; it was the 29th meeting between former Conference USA rivals. Louisville rallied from a 14-point deficit to win their sixth contest in a row against Southern Miss.

Beef 'O' Brady's stopped sponsoring the bowl after the 2013 edition. On June 18, 2014, it was announced that Bitcoin payment service provider BitPay would become the new sponsor of the game under a two-year deal, renamed the Bitcoin St. Petersburg Bowl. Bitcoin, the digital currency, was accepted for ticket and concession sales at the game as part of the sponsorship, and the sponsorship itself was also paid for using bitcoin.  On April 2, 2015, after one year of sponsorship, BitPay declined to renew sponsorship of the game, and it was again called the St. Petersburg Bowl for the next two years.

On August 23, 2017, Bad Boy Mowers signed a three-year deal to become the official title sponsor of the game, which was rebranded as the Bad Boy Mowers Gasparilla Bowl, after Tampa's Gasparilla Pirate Festival. The sponsorship ended after the 2019 game.

On October 20, 2020, Union Home Mortgage signed on as title sponsor of the bowl, making it the Union Home Mortgage Gasparilla Bowl. The 2020 edition of the bowl was set to matchup South Carolina and UAB. However, on December 22, South Carolina had to withdraw from the bowl due to COVID-19 issues within their program. As no replacement team was available, the bowl was subsequently canceled.

Conference tie-ins
The first three editions of the bowl featured teams from C-USA and the Big East. The American Athletic Conference (AAC) succeeded the Big East after 2013. The bowl entered a six-year agreement with the ACC for the 2014 to 2019 seasons; the ACC would provide a team in 2014 and 2016, and would be an alternate for the other seasons. Ultimately, the only ACC team to play in the bowl during this period was NC State in 2014. Four of the five games from 2015 through 2019 featured a matchup between AAC and C-USA teams. The exception was 2016, when an overall lack of bowl-eligible teams yielded some "odd matchups"; the bowl's 2016 edition featured teams from the MAC and SEC.

As of the 2020 football season, the bowl has a complex set of tie-ins, such that it could feature teams from eight different conferences as well as two independent programs:
 from the Power Five conferences: ACC, Big 12, Pac-12, SEC
 from the Group of Five conferences: AAC, C-USA, MAC, MWC
 independent programs: Army, BYU

Stadium

The bowl has utilized two venues; Tropicana Field in St. Petersburg for its first 10 editions, and Raymond James Stadium in nearby Tampa starting with the 11th playing, in December 2018.

Tropicana Field is the home ballpark of the Tampa Bay Rays and was specifically designed for baseball. The football gridiron was situated down the right field line from near home plate to the outfield wall. It was one of several college bowl games played in baseball-specific stadiums, a list which included the Guaranteed Rate Bowl (Chase Field; moved to Sun Devil Stadium and is currently known as Cactus Bowl, eventually returning), the Pinstripe Bowl (Yankee Stadium), the Fight Hunger Bowl (AT&T Park; since moved to Levi's Stadium and is now on hiatus), and the Miami Beach Bowl (Marlins Park; bowl moved to Frisco, Texas, then discontinued). This practice ended after the 2018 game, when the bowl moved to Tampa; as of 2021, Chase Field and Yankee Stadium still host their respective bowls and have since been joined by Fenway Park, which is host of the Fenway Bowl, and Petco Park, which became the home of the Holiday Bowl after SDCCU Stadium was closed and demolished.

Game results

Source:

MVPs
From 2008 through 2016, an MVP was selected from each team; since 2017, a single game MVP is named.

Source:

Most appearances

Updated through the December 2022 edition (14 games, 28 total appearances).

Teams with multiple appearances

Teams with a single appearance
Won (7): East Carolina, Louisville, Mississippi State, NC State, Rutgers, Temple, Wake Forest

Lost (8): Ball State, Connecticut, Florida, Memphis, Miami (OH), Missouri, Ohio, Southern Miss

Appearances by conference
Updated through the December 2022 edition (14 games, 28 total appearances).

 The American's record includes appearances of the Big East Conference, as The American retains the charter of the original Big East, following its 2013 realignment. Teams representing the Big East appeared in three games, compiling a 3–0 record.
 UCF has appeared as both a member of C-USA (2009 and 2012) and The American (2014, 2019, and 2021).

Game records

Source:

Media coverage

The bowl has been televised on ESPN since its inception, and broadcast on ESPN Radio and later Gameday Radio.

Notes

References

External links
 

 
2008 establishments in Florida
College football bowls
Recurring sporting events established in 2008
Sports in St. Petersburg, Florida